Peacekeeper is an EP by the American noise rock band Barkmarket, released on November 21, 1995 by Man's Ruin Records.

Track listing

Personnel 
Adapted from the Peacekeeper  liner notes.
Barkmarket
 Scott Columbo – drums (B2)
 John Nowlin – bass guitar
 Dave Sardy – lead vocals, guitar, production, recording
 Rock Savage – drums (A1, A2, B1)

Release history

References

External links 
 

1995 EPs
Man's Ruin Records EPs
Barkmarket albums
Albums produced by Dave Sardy